Hyperolius houyi is a species of frog in the family Hyperoliidae. It is only known from its type locality, "Ussagara, Neu Kamerum", which some sources consider untraceable but place in the modern-day Chad, while others associate it with Ussagara in Tanzania instead. Common name Ussagara reed frog has been coined for this species.

Etymology
The specific name houyi honours Dr Reinhard Houy who collected in Tanzania in 1911–1912.

Taxonomy
The taxonomic status of Hyperolius houyi is unclear. The holotype is lost. It is probably a synonym of Hyperolius viridiflavus (superspecies).

Habitat and conservation
Hyperolius houyi probably breeds in bodies of water. Threats to this poorly known species are unknown.

References

houyi
Frogs of Africa
Amphibians described in 1931
Taxa named by Ernst Ahl
Taxonomy articles created by Polbot